Expedia Group, Inc., headquartered in Seattle, owns and operates travel fare aggregators and travel metasearch engines, including Expedia.com, Hotels.com, Vrbo, Travelocity, Hotwire.com, Orbitz, Ebookers, CheapTickets, CarRentals.com, Expedia Cruises, Wotif, and Trivago. Over 3 million lodging facilities and flights on over 500 airlines are bookable on the company's websites.

The word "Expedia" is derived from a combination of "exploration" and "speed".

History
Founded as a division of Microsoft in October 1996, Expedia was spun off into a public company in 1999. IAC, known at the time as USA Networks Inc, acquired a controlling interest in the company for in 2001 and acquired the remainder of the company in 2003. In August 2005, IAC spun off the company. In December 2011, Expedia, Inc. spun off TripAdvisor.

Management history
In 2003, Rich Barton resigned as CEO and was replaced by Erik Blachford.

In December 2004, Dara Khosrowshahi was announced as CEO.

In March 2017, Chelsea Clinton was named to the board of directors of Expedia, with compensation of $45,000 a year in cash, plus $250,000 a year in stock vesting over three years.

In August 2017, Mark Okerstrom became the President and CEO of Expedia, Inc.

In December 2019, Mark Okerstrom and Alan Pickerill resigned as CEO and CFO, respectively. At that time, Expedia Group's chairman, Barry Diller, took over day-to-day operations, while the Chief Strategy Officer, Eric Hart, became acting CFO.

In February 2020, Expedia announced it was cutting 3,000 jobs, roughly 12% of the workforce, citing a "disappointing 2019."  Diller, in his role as acting CEO, stated the company had become "sclerotic and bloated" and that employees were "all life and no work."

In April 2020, Peter Kern was appointed as CEO of Expedia Group. He was the highest paid CEO in the S&P 500 in 2021, with $296 million in total compensation.

Office and headquarters history
The first employees moved into the new headquarters in October 2019.

In 2021, Expedia built a new campus in DLF Cyber Park, Gurgaon, India.

Acquisition history

In July 2015, Expedia made an investment in Wingz.

Divestitures

Criticism and legal issues

Delays in refunds of flights cancelled due to COVID-19
In 2020, during the COVID-19 pandemic, customers complained regarding the process to get refunds for cancelled flights. Customers complained of excessively long call times and being unable to get through to a representative. This led to many lawsuits.

Involvement in Israeli settlements

On February 12, 2020, Expedia Group was included on a list of companies operating in West Bank settlements involved in activities that "raised particular human rights concerns" published by the United Nations Human Rights Council. The company was categorized under "the provision of services and utilities supporting the maintenance and existence of settlements". The international community considers Israeli settlements built on land occupied by Israel to be in violation of international law.

False advertising and trademark violation
In August 2016, Buckeye Tree Lodge and Sequoia Village Inn, LLC filed a class-action lawsuit in California accusing the company and its partners of violating trademark rights of numerous independent hotel and motel establishments by running advertising implying that consumers could book reservations for those hotels on Expedia even though Expedia had no relationship with those hotels, in violation of the Lanham Act, and also falsely noting that hotels with which the company had no relationship were "sold out". In April 2021, the lawsuit was settled and the company promised not to engage in false advertising.

Australian false advertising suit

South Carolina sales tax suit
In January 2011, Travelscape, a subsidiary of Expedia Inc. based in the Las Vegas Valley, was ordered to pay $6.3 million in back sales taxes to South Carolina by the South Carolina Supreme Court. Travelscape argued that South Carolina's efforts to tax online retailers located out-of-state violate the Dormant Commerce Clause. In a unanimous ruling, the court determined that, while Travelscape does not have physical facilities in South Carolina, frequent sales trips made by its employees and the fact that the company furnished hotel rooms in the state establish its presence for tax purposes and is sufficient to be required to pay sales tax.

Notes

References

External links
 

 
1999 initial public offerings
2003 mergers and acquisitions
American companies established in 1996
Companies based in Seattle
Companies listed on the Nasdaq
Corporate spin-offs
Former Microsoft subsidiaries
Hospitality companies established in 1996
Internet properties established in 1996
Online retailers of the United States
Online travel agencies
Retail companies established in 1996
Travel management